Rhinomonas lateralis is a species of cryptomonad given its current designation in 1988.

References

Cryptomonads